Ponthooval is a 1983 Indian Malayalam-language film, directed by J. Williams.  The film's score was composed by Raghu Kumar.

Cast

Ratheesh 
Madhavi 
Captain Raju 
Bheeman Raghu 
Kunchan

Soundtrack
The music was composed by Raghu Kumar with lyrics by Poovachal Khader.

References

External links
 

1983 films
1980s Malayalam-language films
Films scored by Raghu Kumar